Air Alsie is a Danish charter airline headquartered in Sønderborg and based at Sønderborg Airport, which operates business jet services.

Destinations

Air Alsie operates all scheduled services for its sister brand Alsie Express. 

Since August 2020, Air Alsie also operates scheduled flights on behalf of Lübeck Airport for the virtual airline Lübeck Air to Munich and Stuttgart - and from January 2021 also to Bern and Salzburg - after there were no scheduled operations in Lübeck for several years. In March 2023, Lübeck Air announced it would end its ATR flights and seek to start jet operations with another airline.

Fleet

As of January 2019, the Air Alsie fleet consists of the following aircraft:

References

External links

 Official site
 Lübeck Air

Airlines of Denmark
1989 establishments in Denmark
Airlines established in 1989